Imbituba Futebol Clube, commonly known as Imbituba, is a Brazilian football club based in Imbituba, Santa Catarina state. The club was formerly known as Centro de Futebol Zico Imbituba Futebol Clube.

History
The club was founded on February 1, 2007 as Centro de Futebol Zico Imbituba Futebol Clube due to a partnership between Centro Esportivo Alberto Rodrigues and Rio de Janeiro-base club Centro de Futebol Zico Sociedade Esportiva. They won the Campeonato Catarinense Second Level in 2009, after beating Juventus in the final. After Centro de Futebol Zico Sociedade Esportiva left the partnership, the club was renamed to Imbituba Futebol Clube.

Achievements
 Campeonato Catarinense Second Level:
 Winners (1): 2009

Stadium
Imbituba Futebol Clube play their home games at Estádio Emília Mendes Rodrigues, nicknamed Estádio Ninho da Águia. The stadium has a maximum capacity of 5,000 people.

References

Association football clubs established in 2007
Football clubs in Santa Catarina (state)
2007 establishments in Brazil